Eupithecia rindgei is a moth in the family Geometridae first described by James Halliday McDunnough in 1949. It is found in the US state of California.

The wingspan is about 15 mm. The forewings are pale creamy, lightly sprinkled with smoky. There are traces of pale flesh-colored (the idealized color of the skin of a white person in 1949) shadings in the basal and subterminal areas. The hindwings are similar in color to the forewings, with faint a discal dot and curved postmedian and subterminal smoky cross lines. The terminal area is somewhat darker shaded than the remainder of the wing. Adults have been recorded on wing from May to July.

References

Moths described in 1949
rindgei
Moths of North America